The 2009 Qantas Film and Television Awards were held on Saturday 5 September at the Civic Theatre in Auckland, New Zealand. The craft awards were presented in a separate awards lunch at the Civic Theatre Friday 4 September. Highlights from the main awards evening were broadcast on TV3.

Nominees and winners 

Awards were given in 60 categories, covering news and current affairs, general television, feature film and short film.

News and Current Affairs 

Qantas Best News
 ONE News (TV One) 3 News (TV3)
 Tonight (TV One)Best News or Current Affairs Presenter Kevin Milne, Fair Go (TV One) Paul Henry, Breakfast (TV One)
 Andrew Saville, ONE News (TV One)Best News Reporting Amanda Gillies, 3 News, "Victoria Bush Fires" (TV3) Guyon Espiner, ONE News, "Ele Peters" (TV One)
 Duncan Garner, 3 News, "Secret Tapes" (TV3)Best Current Affairs Reporting for a weekly programme or one off current affairs special John Hudson, Stephen Butler, Leander Scott-Donelan, Portia Mao, Sunday; "Bad Milk" (TV One) 
 Pete Cronshaw, Cara Darvill,  20/20; "Baby Business" (TV2)
 Mike McRoberts, John Stephenson, 60 Minutes, "Bread Basket/Basket Case" (TV3)Best Current Affairs Reporting for a daily programme Robyn Janes, Louisa Cleave, Corinne Ambler, Mike Hosking, Close Up, "Schools" (TV One) 
 Donna-Marie Lever, Close Up, "Family: The Gunman's Mum" (TV One)
 Kate McCallum, Louisa Cleave, Michael Holland, Mike Valintine, Close Up, "Rest Home" (TV One)Best Current Affairs Series Q+A, Episode 3 (TV One) Native Affairs, "Hikoi" Episode 9 (Maori Television)
 Sunday, Episode 14 (TV One)Investigation of the Year Ian Sinclair, Dale Owens, Sunday, "Dr Disaster 2" (TV One) John Hudson, Stephen Butler, Leander Scott-Donelan, Portia Mao, Sunday, "Bad Milk" (TV One) 
 Kate McCallum, Louisa Cleave, Michael Holland, Mike Valintine, Close Up, "Rest Home" (TV One)

 News and Current Affairs (craft) Best News Camera Jared Mason, ONE News, "US Election: McCain Campaign" (TV One) James Marshall, Breakfast, "Skifield Prepares to Open" (TV One)
 Cameron Williams, 3 News, "Anzac Day in Tinui and Chatham Islands" (TV3)Best Current Affairs Camera Christopher Brown, 20/20, "The Amazing Race" (TV2) Scott Behrnes, Campbell Live, "Merino" (TV3)
 Patrice Hutchinson, Native Affairs, "Tini Whetu I Te Rangi" (Maori Television)Best News Editing Kirsten Bolam, ONE News, "Ironwoman" (TV One) Tony Clark, ONE News, "National Party candidates in South Auckland" (TV One)
 Rebecca O'Sullivan, Sunrise/Nightline, "Jetboat", "Queenstown Artist and Retronude exhibit" (TV3)Best Current Affairs Editing Will Kong, Sunday, "17 Hours" (TV One) Paul Enticott, 60 Minutes, "No Fixed Abode" (TV3)
 Paul Sparkes, Close Up, "Rock School" (TV One)

 General Television  Best Drama Programme Until Proven Innocent, Paula Boock, Donna Malane; Lippy Pictures Ltd (TV One) Outrageous Fortune, John Laing, South Pacific Pictures (TV3)
 Piece of My Heart, Michele Fantl, MF Films Ltd (TV One) Best Comedy Programme The Jaquie Brown Diaries, Jaquie Brown, Gerard Johnstone; Young, Gifted & Brown (TV3) The Millen Baird Show, Rachel Gardner, Great Southern Television (TV3)
 The Pretender, Rachel Gardner, Great Southern Television (TV One)Best Maori Language Programme Ka Haku Au, Maramena Roderick, Ngahuia Wade; Maramena Ltd (Maori Television) Ko Tawa, Jeni-Leigh Walker, Maori Television (Maori Television)
 Maumahara, Hinewehi Mohi, Raukatauri Productions Ltd (Maori Television)Best Children's/Youth Programme Play It Strange 2008, Rachel Jean, Isola Productions Ltd (C4) Let's Get Inventin', Luke Nola, Television Spaceman Ltd (TV2)
 Polyfest '09, Lisa Taouma, TVNZ (TV2)Best Information/Lifestyle Programme Hunger for the Wild, Peter Young, Fisheye Films Ltd (TV One) Fair Go, Graeme Muir, TVNZ (TV One)
 What's Really in Our Food, Vincent Burke, Laurie Clarke; Top Shelf Productions Ltd (TV3)Best Entertainment Programme Dancing with the Stars, Debra Kelleher, TVNZ (TV One) Eating Media Lunch, Paul Casserly, Great Southern Television (TV2)
 Who Wants To Be A Millionaire?, Tony Holden, Steve Gilbert; Great Southern Television (TV One)Best Sports Broadcast International Netball Series 2008, Barbara Mitchell, TVNZ (TV One) Heineken Open Tennis Finals, Steve Jamieson, TVNZ (TV One)
 Powerbuilt Tools Motorsport, David Turner, TVNZ (TV One)Best Event Coverage Vodafone New Zealand Music Awards, Arwen O'Connor, Satellite Media (C4) C4 goes to Vodafone Homegrown, Satellite Media/C4 (C4)
 ONE News Special: Election '08, Darryl Walker, TVNZ (TV One)Best Observational Reality Series Rescue 1, Martin Cleave, Great Southern Television (TV2) Piha Rescue, Eric Derks, South Pacific Video Productions Ltd (TV One)
 The Zoo, Sharon Bennett for Greenstone Pictures, Greenstone Pictures (TV2)Best Constructed Reality Series Missing Pieces, David Lomas, Eyeworks New Zealand (TV3) New Zealand's Next Top Model, Anna Lynch, TV3 (TV3)
 Sensing murder, David Harry Baldock, Geoff Husson, Cinna Smith; Ninox Television (TV2)Best Performance by an Actress – General Television Emily Barclay, Piece of My Heart, MF Films Ltd (TV One) Sarah Peirse, Aftershock, Gibson Group (TV3)
 Annie Whittle, Piece of My Heart, MF Films Ltd (TV One)Best Performance by a Supporting Actress – General Television Keisha Castle-Hughes, Piece of My Heart, MF Films Ltd (TV One) Bronwyn Bradley, Go Girls, South Pacific Pictures (TV2)
 Siobhan Marshall, Outrageous Fortune, South Pacific Pictures (TV3)Best Performance by an Actor – General Television Cohen Holloway, Until Proven Innocent, Lippy Pictures Ltd (TV One) Bob McLaren, The Pretender, Great Southern Television (TV One)
 Antony Starr, Outrageous Fortune, South Pacific Pictures (TV3)Best Performance by a Supporting Actor – General Television Peter Elliott, Until Proven Innocent, Lippy Pictures Ltd (TV One) Owen Black, Shortland Street, South Pacific Pictures (TV2)
 Andre King, The Pretender, Great Southern Television (TV One)Best Presenter Entertainment/Factual Programme Jason Gunn, Dancing with the Stars, TVNZ (TV One) Petra Bagust, What's Really in Our Food, Top Shelf Productions Ltd (TV3)
 Te Radar, Off The Radar, JAM TV (TV One)Best Script – Drama/Comedy Programme James Griffin, Rachel Lang, Outrageous Fortune, South Pacific Pictures (TV3) Paula Boock, Donna Malane, Until Proven Innocent, Lippy Pictures Ltd (TV One)
 Fiona Samuel, Piece of My Heart, MF Films Ltd (TV One)Best Director – Drama/Comedy Programme Brendon Donovan, Aftershock, Gibson Group (TV3) Peter Burger, Until Proven Innocent, Lippy Pictures Ltd (TV One)
 Fiona Samuel, Piece of My Heart, MF Films Ltd (TV One)Best Director – Factual/Entertainment Programme Paul Casserly, Eating Media Lunch, Great Southern Television (TV2) Jane Andrew, Off The Radar, JAM TV (TV One)
 Paul Murphy, Sensing murder, Ninox Television (TV2)

 General Television (craft)  Best Multi Camera Direction in General Television Steve Jamieson, IRB World Sevens Series Wellington, TVNZ (TV One) Mitchell Hawkes, Vodafone NZ Music Awards, Satellite Media (C4)
 Mark Owers, Dancing with the Stars, TVNZ (TV One)Best Camera Work – Drama/Comedy Programme David Paul, Until Proven Innocent, Lippy Pictures Ltd (TV One) Simon Baumfield, Aftershock, Gibson Group (TV3)
 Martin Smith, Outrageous Fortune, South Pacific Pictures (TV3)Best Editing – Drama/Comedy Programme Paul Sutorius, Until Proven Innocent, Lippy Pictures Ltd (TV One) Margot Francis, Piece of My Heart, MF Films Ltd (TV One)
 Bryan Shaw, Outrageous Fortune, South Pacific Pictures (TV3)Best Original Music in General Television 
 David Ironside, Lost in Libya, Pacific Screen (TV One) Jonathan Bree, Go Girls, South Pacific Pictures (TV2)
 Conrad Wedde, Luke Buda, Until Proven Innocent, Lippy Pictures Ltd (TV One)Best Sound Design in General Television Phil Burton, Don Paulin, Chris Hiles, Aftershock, Gibson Group (TV3) Tom Miskin, Steve Finnigan, The Amazing Extraordinary Friends, Images & Sound (TV2)
 Carl Smith, Steve Finnigan, Outrageous Fortune, Images & Sound (TV3)Best Production Design in General Television Tracey Collins, Piece of My Heart, MF Films Ltd (TV One) Flux Animation Studios, Buzzy Bee And Friends, Lion Rock Ventures Ltd (TV2)
 John Harding, Until Proven Innocent, Lippy Pictures Ltd (TV One)Best Contribution to Design in General Television Claire Palmer, Dancing with the Stars, TVNZ (TV One) Aftershock Effects Team, Aftershock, Gibson Group (TV3)
 Lesley Burkes-Harding, Until Proven Innocent, Lippy Pictures Ltd (TV One)

 Documentary  Best Popular Documentary A Good Way To Die?, Octopus Pictures (TV3) Life, Death and a Lung Transplant, Rachel Jean, Isola Productions Ltd (TV3)
 Mika Haka Kids, Mika X, Patangaroa Entertainment Ltd (Maori Television)Best Arts/Festival/Feature Documentary The Art Star and the Sudanese Twins, Pietra Brettkelly Assume Nothing, Kirsty MacDonald, Girl on a Bike Films
 Kapiti Art Project, Summer Agnew, Curious Film (TVNZ6)

 Documentary (craft)  Best Director – Documentary Pietra Brettkelly, The Art Star and the Sudanese Twins
 Summer Agnew, Kapiti Art Project, Curious Film (TVNZ6)|
 Gerard Smyth, Barefoot Cinema: The Life And Art Of Cinematographer Alun Bollinger, Frank Film (TV One)

Best Camerawork – Documentary/Factual Programme
 Tony Barnes, Obi Kenobi, Million Dollar Catch, Great Southern Television (TV3)
 Jacob Bryant, The Art Star And The Sudanese Twins
 Peter Young, Hunger For The Wild, Fisheye Films Ltd (TV One)

Best Editing – Documentary/Factual Programme
 Irena Dol, The Art Star And The Sudanese Twins
 Sandor Lau, Squeegee Bandit, Sandor Lau Creations
 Tim Woodhouse, TOKI Does New York, Octopus Pictures (TV One)

Feature Film 

Best Feature Film – budget over $1 million
 Dean Spanley, Matthew Metcalfe, Alan Harris; General Film Corporation
 Apron Strings, Rachel Gardner, Great Southern Television
 Show of Hands, Angela Littlejohn, Great Southern Television

Best Feature Film – budget under $1 million
 The Topp Twins: Untouchable Girls, Arani Cuthbert, Diva Productions
 I'm Not Harry Jenson, Tom Hern, Six String Pictures
 The Map Reader, John Davies, Arkles Entertainment 

Best Director in a Film Feature (budget under and over $1 million)
 Toa Fraser, Dean Spanley, General Film Corporation
 Anthony McCarten, Show of Hands, Great Southern Television
 Sima Urale, Apron Strings, Great Southern Television

Best Lead Actor in a Feature Film 
 Scott Wills, Apron Strings, Great Southern Television
 Joel Edgerton, Separation City, Separation City Productions
 Sam Neill, Dean Spanley, General Film Corporation

Best Lead Actress in a Feature Film 
 Jennifer Ludlam, Apron Strings, Great Southern Television
 Danielle Cormack, Separation City, Separation City Productions
 Melanie Lynskey, Show of Hands, Great Southern Television

Best Supporting Actor in a Feature Film 
 Peter O'Toole, Dean Spanley, General Film Corporation 
 Les Hill, Separation City, Separation City Productions
 Cameron Rhodes, I'm Not Harry Jenson, Six String Pictures

Best Supporting Actress in a Feature Film 
 Bonnie Soper, The Map Reader, Arkles Entertainment
 Nancy Brunning, The Strength of Water, Filmwork Ltd
 Michelle Langstone, Separation City, Separation City Productions

Best Screenplay for a Feature Film 
 Alan Sharp, Dean Spanley, General Film Corporation
 Briar Grace-Smith, The Strength of Water, Filmwork Ltd
 Shuchi Kothari, Dianne Taylor, Apron Strings, Great Southern Television

Feature Film (craft) 

Best Cinematography in a Feature Film
 Rewa Harre, Apron Strings, Great Southern Television
 Bogumil Godfrejow, The Strength of Water, Filmwork Ltd
 Leon Narbey, Dean Spanley, General Film Corporation

Best Editing in a Feature Film 
 Harold Brodie, The Map Reader, Arkles Entertainment
 Eric de Beus, Apron Strings, Great Southern Television
 Chris Plummer, Dean Spanley, General Film Corporation

Best Original Music in a Feature Film 
 Jools Topp, Lynda Topp, The Topp Twins: Untouchable Girls, Diva Productions
 Don McGlashan, Dean Spanley, General Film Corporation
 Samuel Flynn Scott, Luke Buda, Separation City, Separation City Productions

Best Sound Design in a Feature Film 
 Dave Whitehead, The Strength of Water, Filmwork Ltd
 Chris Burt, David Long, The Topp Twins: Untouchable Girls, Diva Productions
 Paul Cotterell, Dean Spanley, General Film Corporation

Best Production Design in a Feature Film 
 Johnny Hawkins, Apron Strings, Great Southern Television
 Rick Kofoed, The Strength of Water, Filmwork Ltd
 Andrew McAlpine, Dean Spanley, General Film Corporation

Best Costume Design in a Feature Film 
 Odile Dicks-Mireaux, Dean Spanley, General Film Corporation
 Kirsty Cameron, The Strength of Water, Filmwork Ltd 

Best Make-Up Design in a Feature Film 
 Marese Langan, Dean Spanley, General Film Corporation
 Deb Watson, The Strength of Water, Filmwork Ltd

Short film 

Best Short Film
 Mark Albiston, Louis Sutherland, The Six Dollar Fifty Man, Sticky Pictures Limited 
 James Cunningham, Poppy, Supercollider Ltd
 Grant Major, Undergrowth, Octopus Pictures

Best Performance in a Short Film
 Oscar Vandy-Connor, The Six Dollar Fifty Man, Sticky Pictures Limited
 Ian Hughes, Undergrowth, Octopus Pictures
 Cameron Rhodes, Brave Donkey, Robber's Dog Films

Short Film (craft) 

Best Screenplay for a Short Film
 Mark Albiston, Louis Sutherland, The Six Dollar Fifty Man, Sticky Pictures Limited
 David Coyle, Poppy, Supercollider Ltd
 Peter Force, Adam Strange, Aphrodite's Farm, JoyRide Films Ltd

Outstanding Technical Contribution to a Short Film
 James Cunningham, Poppy, Supercollider Ltd
 Cushla Dillon, Brave Donkey, Robber's Dog Films
 Ginny Loane, Brave Donkey, Robber's Dog Films

References 

New Zealand film awards
New Zealand television awards
Qantas Awards
New Zealand
New Zealand
Awards
2000s in New Zealand cinema
Qantas